Pouria Norouzian (born 22 January 1992) is an Iranian sports shooter. He competed in the men's 10 metre air rifle event at the 2016 Summer Olympics.

References

External links
 

1991 births
Living people
Iranian male sport shooters
Olympic shooters of Iran
Shooters at the 2016 Summer Olympics
Shooters at the 2014 Asian Games
Shooters at the 2018 Asian Games
Asian Games competitors for Iran
Islamic Solidarity Games competitors for Iran
Islamic Solidarity Games medalists in shooting
21st-century Iranian people